Buttermilk is a type of liquid dairy product, but can also refer to:

Animals

Buttermilk (horse) (1941–1972), appeared in numerous American Western films with cowgirl star Dale Evans
Buttermilk Sky, Nigerian Dwarf goat and 2012 Internet viral video sensation

Music
"Buttermilk" was a single by Sly Stone, released on the Autumn records label in 1965
"Ole Buttermilk Sky" a song covered by The Page Boys

Places in the United States

Buttermilk, Arkansas
Buttermilk, Kansas
Buttermilk, Missouri
Buttermilk Channel, New York
Buttermilk (ski area), part of the Aspen/Snowmass resort complex in Colorado
The Buttermilks, also known as the Buttermilk country, near Bishop, California